Elviss Krastiņš (born 15 September 1994) is a Latvian-born Finnish male volleyball player. He is part of the Finland men's national volleyball team. On club level he plays for Topvolley Antwerpen.

References

External links
Profile at FIVB.org

1994 births
Living people
Finnish men's volleyball players
Place of birth missing (living people)
Finnish people of Latvian descent
Finnish expatriates in Belgium
Expatriate volleyball players in Belgium
People from Sigulda
Resovia (volleyball) players